Chosna  is a village with about 372 people, in the administrative district of Gmina Prażmów, within Piaseczno County, Masovian Voivodeship, in east-central Poland.

References

Chosna